Niccolò Semitecolo was a 14th-century Italian (Born in Venice) painter of the early-Renaissance period, active mainly in Venice. His work demonstrates the influence of Giotto.

References

14th-century Italian painters
Italian male painters
Italian Renaissance painters
Painters from Venice
Year of death unknown
Year of birth unknown